The 2022–23 Air Force Falcons men's basketball team represented the United States Air Force Academy during the 2022–23 NCAA Division I men's basketball season. The Falcons were led by head coach Joe Scott in his 3rd season (7th overall) with the program and played their home games for the 55th season at Clune Arena in Colorado Springs, Colorado. They participated as members of the Mountain West Conference for the 24th season.

Previous season 
The Falcons finished the 2021–22 season 11–18, 4–13 in Mountain West play to finish in 10th place.

The Falcons faced 7-seed Utah State in the first round of the Mountain West tournament, where they were defeated 56–83 to end their season.

Offseason

Departures

Roster

Schedule and results 

|-
!colspan=12 style=| Non-conference regular season

|-
!colspan=12 style=| Mountain West regular season

 

  

  
  
 
|-
!colspan=12 style=| Mountain West tournament

Source

References 

Air Force
Air Force Falcons men's basketball seasons
Run
Run